The attorney general of Israel (Ha-Yo'etz Ha-Mishpati La-Memshala, lit. Legal Advisor to the Government) heads the legal system of the executive branch and the public prosecution of the state. The attorney general advises the government in legal matters, represents the state authorities in court, advises in the preparation of legal memoranda for the government in general and the justice minister in particular. Likewise she or he examines and advises upon private member's bills in the Knesset.

Additionally, the attorney general is tasked with protecting the rule of law and, as such, entrusted with protecting the public interest from possible harm by government authorities. It is an independent appointed position, one of the most important and influential in the Israeli democracy, and a central institution in the framework of the Israeli legal system. Owing to the common law tradition of the domestic legal system, the duties of the attorney general are not codified in law and have been born out of precedent and tradition over the years. In February 2022, lawyer Gali Baharav-Miara received unanimous backing from the cabinet to become the first-ever female attorney general.

Duties
The attorney general has four main duties:
 Head of the public prosecution system
 Representative of the state in all legal proceedings
 Chief legal counsel to the government
 Representative of the public interest in any legal matter

History
In 1997 a commission in the chairmanship of the former president of the Israeli Supreme Court, Meir Shamgar, had been established for examination of the possibilities of the future legislation on the subject of the attorney general, and recommended that the official title of his or her position will be changed from "the legal adviser to the government" to "the chief legal adviser" to reflect his responsibility for ensuring the rule of law in all of the arms of government, and not only as an adviser to the government itself in matters of law. Likewise the commission recommended that the adviser will be appointed by the government according to the recommendations of a public commission, that will include five members: a retired judge of the supreme court, a former justice minister or attorney general, a Knesset member who will be chosen by the Constitutional Affairs committee of the Knesset, an attorney who will be chosen by the national council of the Israel Bar Association, and a legal expert in the subjects of civil and criminal law who will be chosen by the heads of the university law schools in Israel—in order to ensure the choosing of an appropriate person who possesses the fitting qualifications for the job. This recommendation regarding the selection committee was adopted in August 2000, but the recommendation regarding the title of the position was not adopted.

It is customary that the decision whom to select for the legal adviser position out of the list of nominees that the public commission recommended is done by the justice minister whose selection is brought to the approval of the government, which usually approves the appointment.

The manner in which the Attorney General carries out the duties assigned to his or her position is derived to a large extent from the personality of the person holding the position. Two of the legal advisers, Aharon Barak and Yitzhak Zamir, who came to the position from academia, were distinguished in the decisiveness that they demonstrated for the guarding of the rule of law in Israel, even when their ideas conflicted with those of the government.

Deputy positions
Deputy Attorney General for consultation
Deputy Attorney General for legislation
Deputy Attorney General for Hebrew (i.e., Jewish) law 
Deputy Attorney General for special assignments
Deputy Attorney General for civil matters
Deputy Attorney General for criminal matters
Deputy Attorney General for fiscal-economic matters

List of attorneys general

Comparison with government legal advisors in other countries

The position of binding advice and representational monopoly in Israel is exceptional and even unique by global standards. As Dr. Eitan Levontin describes, "there is no such thing, to the best of my understanding, in any other place. The legal situation in Israel is not a minority opinion, but rather a single opinion, and it seems to me that a chasm – not just a disagreement – lies between it and the legal situation in any comparable country."

By contrast, in the UK, the US, Canada and Germany, the AG – or the parallel figure – is a political role similar to the minister, and in some countries is actually a government minister. As such, they have no power to bind the government to their positions; the government can act in oppositions to their positions; the government is authorized to dictate to the AG the position to present before courts; and he is forbidden to put together legal opinions absent government request.

References

Further reading
 Zilber, Dina. In The Name of The Law. Kinneret, Zmora Bitan, Dvir. 2012 (in Hebrew).

External links
Attorney General on the Israeli Ministry of Justice website
Gad Barzilai and David Nachmias, The Attorney General: Authority and Responsibility. Israel Democratic Institute 1997.
Aviad Bakshi: Legal advisers and the government: analysis and recommendations
Shaked: "A-G has no veto over what is legal" on the Jerusalem Post website
KPF conference on AG and the government

Government of Israel